Pranshu Vijayran (born 18 November 1995) is an Indian cricketer. He plays Twenty20 cricket for Delhi. He made his List A debut for Delhi in the 2018–19 Vijay Hazare Trophy on 20 September 2018.

See also
 List of Delhi cricketers

References

External links
 

1995 births
Living people
Indian cricketers
Delhi cricketers
Cricketers from Delhi